WYGC (104.9 FM) is a commercial radio station licensed to High Springs, Florida and serving the Gainesville metropolitan area.  It broadcasts a Country/Southern rock radio format, simulcasting WXUS 102.3 FM Dunnellon.  It is owned by JVC Media through licensee  JVC Mergeco, LLC and calls itself U.S. 102.3.

History
The station signed on the air in 1984.  It previously broadcast a classic hits format as "104.9 WOW FM" until August 3, 2016, a country music format (simulcasting WTRS 102.3 FM Dunnellon, Florida) until February 10, 2014, and before that, a sports radio format as "105 The Game" until May 31, 2013.

On May 23, 2016, at 6 a.m., WOW FM moved over to sister station WXJZ, using a more powerful signal. On August 4, 2016, at midnight, WYGC ended its simulcast of WOW FM with WXJZ by flipping to a talk format branded as "104.9 - The Talk of Gainesville".

In 2017, WYGC flipped to a simulcast of WMFQ "Q92.9" in Ocala after a long period of dead air.

In March 2018, the station flipped to a 1980s-focused classic hits format branded as Y105. The station operated under a local marketing agreement by Circuitwerkes, using air staff from WGVR-LP. In early-November 2019, JVC Broadcasting announced that the station would flip to a hot talk format on November 11, Florida Man Radio, simulcasting WDYZ 660 AM in Orlando.

Previous logo

References

External links

YGC
Radio stations established in 1991
1991 establishments in Florida
Country radio stations in the United States